Rhododendron subsection Brachycalyx is a subsection  of the genus Rhododendron, in section Tsutsusi, subgenus Azaleastrum, consisting of fifteen species of Azaleas from Asia.

Description 
Leaves deciduous, pseudoverticillate, rhombic, crowded at the shoot apex and monomorphic, hairs usually confined to axils.

Taxonomy 
The section Brachcalyx  was first proposed by JC Tate  based on the Chinese Rhododendron farrerae, and described by Robert Sweet in 1831, in The British Flower Garden.

Species;

 Rhododendron amagianum
 Rhododendron decandrum
 Rhododendron dilatatum
 Rhododendron farrerae
 Rhododendron hidakanum
 Rhododendron kiyosumense
 Rhododendron lagopus
 Rhododendron mariesii
 Rhododendron mayebarae
 Rhododendron nudipes
 Rhododendron reticulatum
 Rhododendron sanctum
 Rhododendron tashiroi
 Rhododendron viscistylum
 Rhododendron wadanum
 Rhododendron weyrichii

References

Bibliography 
 Loretta Goetsch, Andrew Eckert and Benjamin Hall. Classification of genus Rhododendron.  2005 Annual ARS Convention
 
 
 Pojarkova AI, in Schischkin & Bobrov, Flora URSS. 18: 55. 1952.

External links 
 Flora of China
 Flora Republica Popularis Sinicae
 Tropicos, see also Section Tsutsusi 
 

Brachycalyx
Plant subsections